The Lower Anthracite Transportation System (LATS) is a small transportation system serving Mount Carmel, Pennsylvania and the surrounding area, primarily of Northumberland County.

Routes

The LATS route system, based out of Mount Carmel, operates two routes that meet at Coal Township Plaza, weekdays and Saturdays, serving outlying communities of Mount Carmel, Atlas, Natalie, Marion Heights, Kulpmont, Walmart, Locust Gap and Ashland on Route 1; and Shamokin township on Route 2.  A third route, operated seasonally, serves Knoebel's Amusement Resort in neighboring Elysburg.

Fare

LATS implemented an adult base fare that is paid upon boarding the bus.  Children pay a discounted fare compared to adults.  Seniors are exempt from a fare, those fares being subsidized by the Pennsylvania State Lottery.

Operations

The borough of Mount Carmel manages LATS service through a contracted service provider, Catawese Coach Lines, a contract that has been in place since early in 2013.  The previous contract was with King Coal Tours, an operator that had been in place for over thirty years.

Connections to other agencies

LATS buses connect to Schuylkill Transportation System buses at Ashland.

References

Bus transportation in Pennsylvania